Procambarus fallax (also known as deceitful crayfish or slough crayfish) is a species of crayfish in the genus Procambarus. It lives in tributaries of the Satilla River in Georgia and Florida. It is the closest relative to the parthenogenetic marbled crayfish, Procambarus virginalis.

External links 
Photos of Procambarus fallax. By meteorologistsam (CC BY-NC 4.0) https://www.gbif.org/pt/occurrence/3008543956

References

Cambaridae
Freshwater crustaceans of North America
Crustaceans described in 1870
Endemic fauna of the United States
Fauna of the Southeastern United States
Taxa named by Hermann August Hagen